Sayville is a station on the Montauk Branch of the Long Island Rail Road in the village of Sayville, New York, on Depot Street between Greeley Avenue and Railroad Avenue. Ferries to Fire Island board from a port south of the station.

History
Sayville station was originally built by the South Side Railroad of Long Island in December 1868, and was the end of the line until April 1869 when the line was extended to Patchogue. From that point until the early 20th century, the station also served as the local post office. At the time, it contained coal sidings, spurs into lumber yards, a freight house west of Greeley Avenue, a dairy farm, and even a horse trolley to the Great South Bay owned by the South Shore Traction Company. The horse trolley was eventually converted into an electric trolley line after being acquired by the Suffolk Traction Company. In November 1905, mail that was delivered to the railroad station was blown out of its pouch by a speeding train and scattered under the tracks and was searched by the postmaster along "half a mile of track." The original station was razed sometime in 1906 and a second depot opened on August 3 that year. When Bayport station was closed by the Long Island Rail Road in 1980, former Bayport commuters opted to use Sayville station. A renovation project took place sometime in 1998–1999. It brought the current pedestrian overpass and sheltered high-level platforms.

Station layout
The station has two high-level side platforms each eight cars long.

References

External links

February 2000 Photo (Unofficial LIRR History Website)
Sayville Station (South Shore Railroad of Long Island) (Arrt's Arrchives)
Sayville Station (Sayville Library)
1999 Sayville Westbound Train (YouTube)
Unofficial LIRR Photography Site (www.lirrpics.com)
Sayville Station
Station from Railroad Avenue from Google Maps Street View

Long Island Rail Road stations in Suffolk County, New York
Islip (town), New York
Railway stations in the United States opened in 1868